Champions of the Wild is a documentary about animals and the effort to protect them and their habitat. The show aired on Discovery Channel in 1998 and 2003, and was narrated by Andrew Gardner. The series was initially co-produced by Omni Film Productions and the National Film Board of Canada.

Episodes

Manatee
Bengal tiger
Siberian tiger
Spotted hyena
Crocodile (Cuban crocodile)
Uganda kob
Wildebeest
Hippopotamus
Cheetah
Elephant
Octopus
Bonobo
Sea horse
Chimpanzee
Gibbon
Howler monkey, capuchin monkey, spider monkey
Tarantula
Lion
Kenya Wildlife vet
Nyzinga Game reserve
African wild dog
Grévy's zebra
Caribou
Elk
Wolverine
Moose
Przewalski's horse
Mountain lion
Bighorn sheep
Canada lynx
Giraffe
American badger

References

Nature educational television series
1990s Canadian documentary television series
Television series about mammals
National Film Board of Canada documentary series
2000s Canadian documentary television series
Animal Planet original programming